Prodidomus rufus is a species of true spider in the family Prodidominae. It is found in Israel, China, Japan, New Caledonia, the United States, Cuba, Argentina, Chile, and St. Helena.

References

Prodidominae
Articles created by Qbugbot
Spiders described in 1847